Lucky Star is a 1929 American romantic drama silent film starring Janet Gaynor and Charles Farrell, and directed by Frank Borzage. The plot involves the impact of World War I upon a farm girl (Gaynor) and a returning soldier (Farrell).

The movie was produced by William Fox with cinematography by Chester A. Lyons and William Cooper Smith, and the supporting cast includes Paul Fix and Guinn "Big Boy" Williams. In the previous two years, Borzage had also directed Gaynor in 7th Heaven and Street Angel, two of the three films (along with F.W. Murnau's Sunrise: A Song of Two Humans) for which Gaynor won the first Academy Award for Best Actress.

The film was produced in two versions- a silent version for the foreign market, and a partly talking version with sound effects and some dialogue for American release. Both versions were thought lost until the silent film was rediscovered in the archives of the Dutch Filmmuseum in the late 1980s and subsequently restored. The talking version of the film remains lost.

Plot 
Timothy Osborn (Farrell) and Martin Wrenn (Williams) work as linemen for a utility in a rural area. Both flirt with Mary Tucker (Gaynor) who is the daughter of a widowed dairy farmer, As the film begins it is 1917, and America becomes involved in World War I. Both men join the U.S. Army.

While on the battlefield, Wrenn and Osborn serve in the same unit, and Wrenn is a sergeant. Ordered to deliver food to men at the front, Wrenn instead purloins the truck that was to be used for the delivery for personal use, and Osborn uses a horse-drawn wagon to deliver the food. While going to the front he is injured by shellfire.

Both men return home, and Osborn now uses a wheelchair. He and Wrenn vie for Mary's affection. She becomes attached to Osborn and visits him every day. Wrenn, who had been kicked out of the Army, uses money and guile to win over Mary's mother, who pressures her to marry Wrenn. She stops seeing Osborn and agrees to marry Wrenn.

In the end, Osborn regains some use of his legs, walks through snow to confront Wrenn just before he is about to wed Mary. Townspeople intervene in their fight and put Wrenn on a train out of town. Osborn reunites with Mary.

Cast
 Janet Gaynor as Mary Tucker
 Charles Farrell as Timothy Osborn
 Guinn "Big Boy" Williams as Martin Wrenn
 Paul Fix as Joe
 Hedwiga Reicher as Mrs. Tucker

References

External links
 
 

1929 films
American silent feature films
American black-and-white films
Films directed by Frank Borzage
American romantic drama films
Fox Film films
1929 romantic drama films
Films produced by William Fox
Films with screenplays by Sonya Levien
1920s English-language films
1920s American films
Silent romantic drama films
Silent American drama films